Baghana is a village and gram panchayat located near Phagwara in Kapurthala District, Punjab, India.

References

Villages in Kapurthala district